Matin Balasan oglu Eynullayev (Azerbaijani: Mətin Eynullayev Balasən oğlu born March 22, 1975) is the current chief of the State Service on Property Issues under the Ministry of Economy (since May 6, 2021), Chairman of Board of Azerbaijan Investment Holding (since August 19, 2020), Deputy Chief of the State Service on Property Issues under the Ministry of Economy (2020-2021), Deputy Minister of Taxes of the Republic of Azerbaijan (2018-2020), Deputy Minister of Education of the Republic of Azerbaijan (2017-2018), Deputy Head of Administration and Head of Administration of the Ministry of Education of the Republic of Azerbaijan (2013-2016).

Life 
Was born on March 22, 1975 in the city of Baku. Married, has 2 children.

Education 
In 1992, was accepted to the law faculty of Baku State University and in 1997 graduated from the same university with honors in law.

Career 
Worked as an adviser in a private law firm, Chief Lawyer at the Social Protection Fund for the Disabled under the Ministry of Labor and Social Protection of Population, Head Consultant of the Corporate Governance Sector of the Ministry of Economic Development of the Republic of Azerbaijan, Head of sector, Deputy  Head of Department, Head of Department of “Icherisheher” State Historical-Architectural Reserve under the Cabinet of Ministers of the Republic of Azerbaijan.

In 2013-2016, worked as Deputy Head of Administration and Head of Administration of the Ministry of Education of the Republic of Azerbaijan.

He was awarded the medal "For Distinction in Civil Service" by the Order of the President of the Republic of Azerbaijan dated June 22, 2015. He is a junior civil service adviser.

By the Order of the President of the Republic of Azerbaijan dated January 11, 2017, was appointed Deputy Minister of Education of the Republic of Azerbaijan.

By the Order of the President of the Republic of Azerbaijan dated January 17, 2018, was appointed Deputy Minister of Taxes of the Republic of Azerbaijan.

By the Order of the President of the Republic of Azerbaijan dated December 27, 2018, was awarded the special rank of State Tax Service Advisor of the 3rd degree.

By the Order of the President of the Republic of Azerbaijan dated May 13, 2020, was appointed Deputy Chief of the State Service on Property Issues under the Ministry of Economy and was entrusted with this position until he was appointed Chief of the State Service on Property Issues.

By the Order of the President of the Republic of Azerbaijan dated August 19, 2020,  was appointed  Chairman of Board of Azerbaijan Investment Holding.

By the Order of the President of the Republic of Azerbaijan dated May 6, 2021, was appointed Chief of the State Service on Property Issues under the Ministry of Economy.

References

See also 

 Cabinet of Azerbaijan
 Ministry of Economy
 State Service on Property Issues

1975 births
Azerbaijani civil servants
Living people
Azerbaijani politicians